The Alexander Nunataks are two coastal nunataks at the southern limit of the Windmill Islands, standing on the shore of Penney Bay  east of the base of the Browning Peninsula. They were first mapped from air photos taken by U.S. Navy Operation Highjump and Operation Windmill in 1947 and 1948, and named by the Advisory Committee on Antarctic Names for Photographer's Mate H.N. Alexander, a member of one of the two Operation Windmill photographic units that obtained air and ground photos of the area in January 1948.

References 

Nunataks of Wilkes Land